Verterae was a Roman fort in the modern-day village of Brough, Cumbria, England. Occupied between the 1st and 5th centuries AD, it protected a key Roman road in the north of England. In the 11th century, Brough Castle was built on part of the site by the Normans. Archaeologists explored the remains during the 20th century, and it is now protected under UK law.

Etymology
The name Verterae, or Verteris, is of Brittonic origin, and derived from the element werther, a plural form meaning either "ramparts" or "high places" (Middle Welsh gwarther). Ferter and Fortriu in Scotland may be derived from the same element.

Roman period
Verterae was probably built by the Roman governor Gnaeus Julius Agricola between AD 79-80, as part of his campaign to conquer the north of Britain. The name meant "the Forts", and it served as a waypoint on the northern leg of the Roman road connecting the Roman towns of Luguvalium with Eboracum – the modern-day cities of Carlisle and York – and points further south. One of a sequence of forts that lay every  to  along the route, the site protected the Stainmore Pass that stretched from the River Eden across the Pennines. The route is a major artery to this day, carrying the A66 across the Pennines.

A settlement called a vicus and cemetery was constructed on the east side of the fort. The vicus included both stone and wattle-and-daub buildings.

Around the time of the late 4th century and early 5th century, an auxiliary unit called the Numerus Directorum, around 300-400 strong, were based in the fort.

Maiden Castle 
Maiden Castle here guards the western approach to the summit of the Stainmore Pass. Old gazetteers claim this fort gave its name to the Maiden Way – the old Roman road from nearby Bravoniacum (Kirkby Thore) north to Magnae (Carvoran) on Hadrian's Wall.

Post-Roman period

Verterae was occupied for a time after the Roman withdrawal around the year 410 but was eventually abandoned. In the 11th century, a Norman castle was built within the ruined walls of the fort. In the 16th century the antiquarian William Camden rediscovered the link between the location and the Roman occupation, arguing that this site, by then called Brough, was the Roman fort of Verterae.

Rubbish from the Roman period was discovered on the site in the mid-19th century, and archaeological excavations were carried out in 1923 by the government. More excavations followed in 1954 and during the 1970s and 1990s, with a comprehensive survey of the site being conducted in 1996. The area of the fort, covering the medieval castle, Brough Castle Farm and the surrounding lands, is protected under UK law as a Scheduled Ancient Monument.

References

Bibliography

 
 
 
 

Roman sites in Cumbria
Roman fortifications in England
Roman auxiliary forts in England